Franz Surges (11 October 1958 – 20 September 2015) was a German composer and musician.

Education
Surges was born in Remagen, Germany.  He studied at the Episcopal School for Church Music, Aachen, and at the Cologne Conservatoire, Department Aachen.
He took the following exams: 
 Cantor-exam (called A-exam)
 Diploma in Music Pedagogy (Organ) 
 Diploma of the Artistic final-exam, main subject organ
 Diploma in Music Pedagogy  (note-setting)

He took further lessons in composition with Tilo Medek.

He completed international masterclasses resp. music academies, e.g. by Jean Guillou, Piet Kee, Guy Bovet, Harald Vogel, Monserrat Torrent.

Position and awards
From 1981 Franz Surges was a church musician at St. Antony, Eschweiler-Roehe (since 2006 also St. Michael, Eschweiler), composer, choir director and music teacher, among others, for church-musical (so-called C-exams). 

Franz Surges obtained a number of prizes and awards, including: 
 First prize composition contest "in Furtherance of Contemporaneous Music Maintenance in Religious Services", Schwäbisch Gmuend (1991) within the framework of the festival "European Church Music" 
 First Prize composition contest "Mayrhofer-Prize", Passau, Germany, 2002
 First Prize composition contest in the town of Siegburg, 2006

Oeuvre
Surges composed works in various genres: choral (male chorus, female chorus, mixed chorus), orchestral, chamber (strings, woodwinds, brass, piano, organ), instrumental and vocal.

Literature
 Anthology of information about Franz Surges

References

External links
 Verlag Dohr – biography and list of works

1958 births
2015 deaths
People from Ahrweiler (district)
German composers